Wat Kanlaya is a khwaeng (sub-district) of Thon Buri District, Bangkok's Thonburi side, regarded as the northeast area of the district adjacent to the Chao Phraya River's west side.

History and presently
Its name after Wat Kanlayanamit, a prominent local Thai Buddhist temple rim Chao Phraya River. The area is considered to be one of the most important areas in Bangkok's history. In the early Ayutthaya period before canalizing Chao Phraya River caused the canals Khlong Bangkok Yai and Khlong Bangkok Noi, this area was home to people on the wooden houseboats.

In the Thonburi period, people were evacuated from Ayutthaya to settle here following its fall in 1767. It's not just Siamese, also includes people of different races such as Vietnamese, Mon, Chinese, Portuguese and Muslims as well. The King Taksin granted a plot of land to all of them divided into proportions according to each religion.

Thus making this area a mix of people of various races and religions. In terms of religion, it consists of three religions and four sects, including Theravāda of Buddhism, Chinese Buddhism, Roman Catholicism, and Sunni Islam. Therefore resulting in many outstanding places of worship in the area also neighboring until the present viz Wat Kanlayanamit, Wat Prayoonwongsawat, Santa Cruz Church, Bang Luang Mosque, Kuan An Keng Shrine, Wat Buppharam Worawihan.

Today, the sub-district is also divided into six communities: Kudi Chin, Kudi Khao, Wat Buppharam, Wat Prayoonwong, Wat Kanlaya, and Rong Kram.

The main artery of area, Kudi Chin is a residence of Thai-Portuguese-Chinese, dates back to Thonburi period around 250 years ago. At present, it is known as a place of cultural tourism.

Geography
Wat Kanlaya has an area of 0.785 km2 (about 0.303 mi2).

Places neighboring this sub-district include (from the north clockwise): Chao Phraya River, Prajadhipok Road, Itsaraphap Road, and Khlong Bangkok Yai.

Population
In 2018 it had a total population of 9,307 people (4,463 men, 4,847 women).

Places

Temples
Wat Kanlayanamit
Wat Prayoonwongsawat
Santa Cruz Church
Bang Luang Mosque
Kuan An Keng Shrine
Wat Buppharam Worawihan

Important places
Kudi Chin Community
Windsor House
Phatthayakosol House
Khlong Somdet Chao Phraya
Khlong Kudi Chin
City Law Enforcement Department Headquarters
Buppharam Metropolitan Police Station
Big C Supercenter Itsaraphap

Educational institutions
The sub-district  consists of 11 educational institutions
Dhonburi Rajabhat University
Suksanari School
Wat Kanlayanamit School
Wat Prayoonwongsawat School
Santa Cruz Convent School
Santa Cruz Suksa School
Sangaroonthonburi Kindergarten & Nursery 
Santa Cruz Kindergarten

Transport
Prajadhipok Road
Itsaraphap Road
Arun Amarin Road
Memorial Bridge (Phut Bridge)
Phra Pok Klao Bridge
 Thetsaban Sai 1 Road
 Thetsaban Sai 2 Road

References

Subdistricts of Bangkok
Thon Buri district
Populated places on the Chao Phraya River